On Broadway Volume 5 is an album by Paul Motian and the Trio 2000 + Two released on the German Winter & Winter label in 2009. The album follows on from the first four volumes of Motian's On Broadway Series featuring features performances of Broadway show tunes.

Reception
The Allmusic review by Alex Henderson awarded the album 4½ stars, stating, "In a sense, On Broadway is an ironic title for this series because Motian certainly doesn't perform standards the way they would be performed in a Broadway theatrical production; he performs them like someone who is hell-bent for hardcore jazz. On Broadway, Vol. 5 is a welcome addition to the series".

Track listing
 "Morrock" (Paul Motian) - 6:38 
 "Something I Dreamed Last Night" (Sammy Fain) - 9:16 
 "Just a Gigolo" (Leonello Casucci) - 6:43 
 "I See Your Face Before Me" (Howard Dietz, Arthur Schwartz) - 12:30 
 "A Lovely Way to Spend an Evening" (Harold Adamson, Jimmy McHugh) - 7:29 
 "Midnight Sun" (Sonny Burke, Lionel Hampton) - 6:57 
 "Sue Me" (Frank Loesser) - 7:06

Personnel
Paul Motian - drums
Loren Stillman - alto saxophone
Michaël Attias - alto and baritone saxophone
Masabumi Kikuchi - piano
Thomas Morgan - bass

References 

2009 albums
Paul Motian albums
Winter & Winter Records albums